Jagdish Chaturvedi was an Indian poet of Hindi literature. He was born on 15 August 1929, at Gwalior in the state of Madhya Pradesh and after securing his master's degree in Philosophy, started his career by joining Madhav College, Ujjain as a member of its faculty. Later, worked in All India Radio and the Central Hindi Directorate as an editor. He published several books of prose and poetry and also translated many books into Hindi language. The Government of India awarded him the fourth highest civilian honour of the Padma Shri in 2003. He died at his Delhi residence in 2015.

References 

Recipients of the Padma Shri in literature & education
1929 births
People from Gwalior district
Poets from Madhya Pradesh
Hindi-language poets
2015 deaths
20th-century Indian poets